Alloclita recisella is a moth in the family Cosmopterigidae. It is found in Portugal, Spain, Greece and on Corsica, Sicily and Cyprus. It has also been recorded from Israel.

The wingspan is 13–15 mm. Adults have been recorded in May and from July to September.

References

Moths described in 1859
Antequerinae
Moths of Europe
Moths of the Middle East